Friday Night Knockout (visually known as MetroPCS Friday Night Knockout for sponsorship reasons) is the branding used for professional boxing telecasts broadcast on the cable network TruTV. This weekly broadcast was co-produced by HBO and Turner Sports.

Coverage overview
What separated TruTV's broadcasts from the time buy deals done by Al Haymon’s Premier Boxing Champions on other networks is that advertising on TruTV was 100% sold by Turner Sports. In other words, Turner controlled all the advertising, including TV commercial time, digital inventory and sponsorships.

MetroPCS Friday Night Knockout debuted on May 1, 2015 (from The Chelsea at The Cosmopolitan of Las Vegas) and featured at least eight bouts from the Top Rank promotion. They would serve as lead-ins for fights airing on HBO the next day.

The final card aired on December 11, 2015 with Nonito Donaire vs. Cesar Juarez and Félix Verdejo taking on Josenilson Dos Santos from San Juan, Puerto Rico.

Technology
TruTV's live boxing telecasts featured the first-ever domestic use of “Spidercam” technology, which operates on a four-point system of cables from designated points beyond the corners of the boxing ring. It also has the ability to operate on a four-point system of cables from designated points beyond the corners of the boxing ring.

Commentators
Kevin Kugler and Bruce Beck provided play-by-play with analysts Ray “Boom Boom” Mancini and Timothy Bradley and reporter Crystina Poncher.

References

External links

TruTV to broadcast boxing series
truTv To Step Into Boxing Ring
Top Rank launching new boxing series on truTV
METROPCS FRIDAY NIGHT KNOCKOUT ON TRUTV CONTINUES FRIDAY, JUNE 26 AT 10 P.M. ET
TOP RANK TO LAUNCH FRIDAY NIGHT BOXING SERIES ON TRUTV BEGINNING MAY 1
“MetroPCS Friday Night Knockout” to Make Its Fall Debut

Boxing television series
TruTV original programming
Turner Sports
HBO Sports
2015 American television series debuts
2015 American television series endings